In geometry, the 16-cell is the regular convex 4-polytope (four-dimensional analogue of a Platonic solid) with Schläfli symbol {3,3,4}. It is one of the six regular convex 4-polytopes first described by the Swiss mathematician Ludwig Schläfli in the mid-19th century. It is also called C16, hexadecachoron, or hexdecahedroid .

It is a part of an infinite family of polytopes, called cross-polytopes or orthoplexes, and is analogous to the octahedron in three dimensions. It is Coxeter's  polytope. Conway's name for a cross-polytope is orthoplex, for orthant complex. The dual polytope is the tesseract (4-cube), which it can be combined with to form a compound figure. The 16-cell has 16 cells as the tesseract has 16 vertices.

Geometry 
The 16-cell is the second in the sequence of 6 convex regular 4-polytopes (in order of size and complexity).

Each of its 4 successor convex regular 4-polytopes can be constructed as the convex hull of a polytope compound of multiple 16-cells: the 16-vertex tesseract as a compound of two 16-cells, the 24-vertex 24-cell as a compound of three 16-cells, the 120-vertex 600-cell as a compound of fifteen 16-cells, and the 600-vertex 120-cell as a compound of seventy-five 16-cells.

Coordinates 
The 16-cell is the 4-dimensional cross polytope, which means its vertices lie in opposite pairs on the 4 axes of a (w, x, y, z) Cartesian coordinate system.

The eight vertices are (±1, 0, 0, 0), (0, ±1, 0, 0), (0, 0, ±1, 0), (0, 0, 0, ±1). All vertices are connected by edges except opposite pairs.

The vertex coordinates form 6 orthogonal central squares lying in the 6 coordinate planes. Squares in opposite planes that do not share an axis (e.g. in the xy and wz planes) are completely disjoint (they do not intersect at any vertices).

The 16-cell constitutes an orthonormal basis for the choice of a 4-dimensional reference frame, because its vertices exactly define the four orthogonal axes.

Structure 
The Schläfli symbol of the 16-cell is {3,3,4}, indicating that its cells are regular tetrahedra {3,3} and its vertex figure is a regular octahedron {3,4}. There are 8 tetrahedra, 12 triangles, and 6 edges meeting at every vertex. Its edge figure is a square. There are 4 tetrahedra and 4 triangles meeting at every edge.

The 16-cell is bounded by 16 cells, all of which are regular tetrahedra. It has 32 triangular faces, 24 edges, and 8 vertices. The 24 edges bound 6 orthogonal central squares lying on great circles in the 6 coordinate planes (3 pairs of completely orthogonal great squares). At each vertex, 3 great squares cross perpendicularly. The 6 edges meet at the vertex the way 6 edges meet at the apex of a canonical octahedral pyramid.

Rotations 

Rotations in 4-dimensional Euclidean space can be seen as the composition of two 2-dimensional rotations in completely orthogonal planes. The 16-cell is a simple frame in which to observe 4-dimensional rotations, because each of the 16-cell's 6 great squares has another completely orthogonal great square (there are 3 pairs of completely orthogonal squares). Many rotations of the 16-cell can be characterized by the angle of rotation in one of its great square planes (e.g. the xy plane) and another angle of rotation in the completely orthogonal great square plane (the wz plane). Completely orthogonal great squares have disjoint vertices: 4 of the 16-cell's 8 vertices rotate in one plane, and the other 4 rotate independently in the completely orthogonal plane.

In 2 or 3 dimensions a rotation is characterized by a single plane of rotation; this kind of rotation taking place in 4-space is called a simple rotation, in which only one of the two completely orthogonal planes rotates (the angle of rotation in the other plane is 0). In the 16-cell, a simple rotation in one of the 6 orthogonal planes moves only 4 of the 8 vertices; the other 4 remain fixed. (In the simple rotation animation above, all 8 vertices move because the plane of rotation is not one of the 6 orthogonal basis planes.)

In a double rotation both sets of 4 vertices move, but independently: the angles of rotation may be different in the 2 completely orthogonal planes. If the two angles happen to be the same, a maximally symmetric isoclinic rotation takes place. In the 16-cell an isoclinic rotation by 90 degrees of any pair of completely orthogonal square planes takes every square plane to its completely orthogonal square plane.

Constructions

Octahedral dipyramid 

The simplest construction of the 16-cell is on the 3-dimensional cross polytope, the octahedron. The octahedron has 3 perpendicular axes and 6 vertices in 3 opposite pairs (its Petrie polygon is the hexagon). Add another pair of vertices, on a fourth axis perpendicular to all 3 of the other axes. Connect each new vertex to all 6 of the original vertices, adding 12 new edges. This raises two octahedral pyramids on a shared octahedron base that lies in the 16-cell's central hyperplane.

The octahedron that the construction starts with has three perpendicular intersecting squares (which appear as rectangles in the hexagonal projections). Each square intersects with each of the other squares at two opposite vertices, with two of the squares crossing at each vertex. Then two more points are added in the fourth dimension (above and below the 3-dimensional hyperplane). These new vertices are connected to all the octahedron's vertices, creating 12 new edges and three more squares (which appear edge-on as the 3 diameters of the hexagon in the projection), and three more octahedra.

Something unprecedented has also been created. Notice that each square no longer intersects with all of the other squares: it does intersect with four of them (with three of the squares crossing at each vertex now), but each square has one other square with which it shares no vertices: it is not directly connected to that square at all. These two separate perpendicular squares (there are three pairs of them) are like the opposite edges of a tetrahedron: perpendicular, but non-intersecting. They lie opposite each other (parallel in some sense), and they don't touch, but they also pass through each other like two perpendicular links in a chain (but unlike links in a chain they have a common center). They are an example of Clifford parallel planes, and the 16-cell is the simplest regular polytope in which they occur. Clifford parallelism of objects of more than one dimension (more than just curved lines) emerges here and occurs in all the subsequent 4-dimensional regular polytopes, where it can be seen as the defining relationship among disjoint regular 4-polytopes and their concentric parts. It can occur between congruent (similar) polytopes of 2 or more dimensions. For example, as noted above all the subsequent convex regular 4-polytopes are compounds of multiple 16-cells; those 16-cells are Clifford parallel polytopes.

Tetrahedral constructions 

The 16-cell has two Wythoff constructions from regular tetrahedra, a regular form and alternated form, shown here as nets, the second represented by tetrahedral cells of two alternating colors. The alternated form is a lower symmetry construction of the 16-cell called the demitesseract.

Wythoff's construction replicates the 16-cell's characteristic 5-cell in a kaleidoscope of mirrors. Every regular 4-polytope has its characteristic 4-orthoscheme, an irregular 5-cell. There are three regular 4-polytopes with tetrahedral cells: the 5-cell, the 16-cell, and the 600-cell. Although all are bounded by regular tetrahedron cells, their characteristic 5-cells (4-orthoschemes) are different tetrahedral pyramids, all based on the same characteristic irregular tetrahedron. They share the same characteristic tetrahedron (3-orthoscheme) and characteristic right triangle (2-orthoscheme) because they have the same kind of cell.

The characteristic 5-cell of the regular 16-cell is represented by the Coxeter-Dynkin diagram , which can be read as a list of the dihedral angles between its mirror facets. It is an irregular tetrahedral pyramid based on the characteristic tetrahedron of the regular tetrahedron. The regular 16-cell is subdivided by its symmetry hyperplanes into 384 instances of its characteristic 5-cell that all meet at its center.

The characteristic 5-cell (4-orthoscheme) has four more edges than its base characteristic tetrahedron (3-orthoscheme), joining the four vertices of the base to its apex (the fifth vertex of the 4-orthoscheme, at the center of the regular 16-cell).

Helical construction 

A 16-cell can be constructed (three different ways) from two Boerdijk–Coxeter helixes of eight chained tetrahedra, each bent in the fourth dimension into a ring. The two circular helixes spiral around each other, nest into each other and pass through each other forming a Hopf link. The 16 triangle faces can be seen in a 2D net within a triangular tiling, with 6 triangles around every vertex. The purple edges represent the Petrie polygon of the 16-cell. The eight-cell ring of tetrahedra contains three octagrams of different colors, eight-edge circular paths that wind twice around the 16-cell on every third vertex of the octagram. The orange and yellow edges are two four-edge halves of one octagram, which join their ends to form a Möbius strip.

Thus the 16-cell can be decomposed into two cell-disjoint circular chains of eight tetrahedrons each, four edges long, one spiraling to the right (clockwise) and the other spiraling to the left (counterclockwise). The left-handed and right-handed cell rings fit together, nesting into each other and entirely filling the 16-cell, even though they are of opposite chirality.

Three eight-edge paths (of different colors) spiral along each eight-cell ring, making 90° angles at each vertex. (In the Boerdijk–Coxeter helix before it is bent into a ring, the angles in different paths vary, but are not 90°.) Three paths (with three different colors and apparent angles) pass through each vertex. When the helix is bent into a ring, the segments of each eight-edge path (of various lengths) join their ends, forming a Möbius strip eight edges long along its single-sided circumference of 8𝝅, and one edge wide. The six four-edge halves of the three eight-edge paths each make four 90° angles, but they are not the six orthogonal great squares: they are open-ended squares, four-edge 360° helices whose open ends are antipodal vertices. The four edges come from four different great squares, and are mutually orthogonal. Combined end-to-end in pairs of the same chirality, the six four-edge paths make three eight-edge Möbius loops, helical octagrams. Each octagram is both a Petrie polygon of the 16-cell, and the helical track along which all eight vertices rotate together, in one of the 16-cell's distinct isoclinic rotations.

Each eight-edge helix is a skew octagram{8/3} that winds twice around the 16-cell and visits every vertex before closing into a loop. Its eight edges are the circular path-near-edges of an isocline, a geodesic arc on which vertices move during an isoclinic rotation. The isoclines connect opposite vertices of face-bonded tetrahedral cells, which are also opposite vertices (antipodal vertices) of the 16-cell, so the isoclines have  chords. The isocline winds around the 16-cell twice (720°) the way the edges of the octagram{8/3} wind around twice, passing alongside each of the  edges once, and alongside each of the  orthogonal axes of the 16-cell twice. The isocline makes a circle of  circumference 8𝝅.

The eight-cell ring is chiral: there is a right-handed form which spirals clockwise, and a left-handed form which spirals counterclockwise. The 16-cell contains one of each, so it also contains a left and a right isocline; the isocline is the circular axis around which the eight-cell ring twists. Each isocline visits all eight vertices of the 16-cell. Each eight-cell ring contains half of the 16 cells, but all 8 vertices; the two rings share the vertices, as they nest into each other and fit together. They also share the 24 edges, though left and right octagram helices are different eight-edge paths.

Because there are three pairs of completely orthogonal great squares, there are three congruent ways to compose a 16-cell from two eight-cell rings. The 16-cell contains three left-right pairs of eight-cell rings in different orientations, with each cell ring containing its axial isocline. Each left-right pair of isoclines is the track of a left-right pair of distinct isoclinic rotations: the rotations in one pair of completely orthogonal invariant planes of rotation. At each vertex, there are three great squares and six octagram isoclines (one left-right pair) that cross at the vertex and share a 16-cell axis chord.

As a configuration 
This configuration matrix represents the 16-cell. The rows and columns correspond to vertices, edges, faces, and cells. The diagonal numbers say how many of each element occur in the whole 16-cell. The nondiagonal numbers say how many of the column's element occur in or at the row's element.

Tessellations 
One can tessellate 4-dimensional Euclidean space by regular 16-cells. This is called the 16-cell honeycomb and has Schläfli symbol {3,3,4,3}. Hence, the 16-cell has a dihedral angle of 120°. Each 16-cell has 16 neighbors with which it shares a tetrahedron, 24 neighbors with which it shares only an edge, and 72 neighbors with which it shares only a single point. Twenty-four 16-cells meet at any given vertex in this tessellation.

The dual tessellation, the 24-cell honeycomb, {3,4,3,3}, is made of regular 24-cells. Together with the tesseractic honeycomb {4,3,3,4} these are the only three regular tessellations of R4.

Projections 

The cell-first parallel projection of the 16-cell into 3-space has a cubical envelope. The closest and farthest cells are projected to inscribed tetrahedra within the cube, corresponding with the two possible ways to inscribe a regular tetrahedron in a cube. Surrounding each of these tetrahedra are 4 other (non-regular) tetrahedral volumes that are the images of the 4 surrounding tetrahedral cells, filling up the space between the inscribed tetrahedron and the cube. The remaining 6 cells are projected onto the square faces of the cube. In this projection of the 16-cell, all its edges lie on the faces of the cubical envelope.

The cell-first perspective projection of the 16-cell into 3-space has a triakis tetrahedral envelope. The layout of the cells within this envelope are analogous to that of the cell-first parallel projection.

The vertex-first parallel projection of the 16-cell into 3-space has an octahedral envelope. This octahedron can be divided into 8 tetrahedral volumes, by cutting along the coordinate planes. Each of these volumes is the image of a pair of cells in the 16-cell. The closest vertex of the 16-cell to the viewer projects onto the center of the octahedron.

Finally the edge-first parallel projection has a shortened octahedral envelope, and the face-first parallel projection has a hexagonal bipyramidal envelope.

4 sphere Venn diagram 
A 3-dimensional projection of the 16-cell and 4 intersecting spheres (a Venn diagram of 4 sets) are topologically equivalent.

Symmetry constructions 
The 16-cell's symmetry group is denoted B4.

It can be drawn bicolored with alternating tetrahedral cells.

It can also be seen in lower symmetry form as a tetrahedral antiprism, constructed by 2 parallel tetrahedra in dual configurations, connected by 8 (possibly elongated) tetrahedra. It is represented by s{2,4,3}, and Coxeter diagram: .

With the tesseract constructed as a 4-4 duoprism, the 16-cell can be seen as its dual, a 4-4 duopyramid.

Related complex polygons 
The Möbius–Kantor polygon is a regular complex polygon 3{3}3, in  shares the same vertices as the 16-cell. It has 8 vertices, and 8 3-edges.

The regular complex polygon, 2{4}4, in  has a real representation as a 16-cell in 4-dimensional space with 8 vertices, 16 2-edges, only half of the edges of the 16-cell.  Its symmetry is 4[4]2, order 32.

Related uniform polytopes and honeycombs 

The regular 16-cell and tesseract are the regular members of a set of 15 uniform 4-polytopes with the same B4 symmetry. The 16-cell is also one of the uniform polytopes of D4 symmetry.

The 16-cell is also related to the cubic honeycomb, order-4 dodecahedral honeycomb, and order-4 hexagonal tiling honeycomb which all have octahedral vertex figures.

It belongs to the sequence of  {3,3,p} 4-polytopes which have tetrahedral cells. The sequence includes three regular 4-polytopes of Euclidean 4-space, the 5-cell {3,3,3}, 16-cell {3,3,4}, and 600-cell {3,3,5}), and the order-6 tetrahedral honeycomb {3,3,6} of hyperbolic space.

It is first in a sequence of quasiregular polytopes and honeycombs h{4,p,q}, and a half symmetry sequence, for regular forms {p,3,4}.

See also 
24-cell
4-polytope
D4 polytope

Notes

Citations

References 

 T. Gosset: On the Regular and Semi-Regular Figures in Space of n Dimensions, Messenger of Mathematics, Macmillan, 1900
 H.S.M. Coxeter:
 
 
 Kaleidoscopes: Selected Writings of H.S.M. Coxeter, edited by F. Arthur Sherk, Peter McMullen, Anthony C. Thompson, Asia Ivic Weiss, Wiley-Interscience Publication, 1995,  Kaleidoscopes: Selected Writings of H.S.M. Coxeter | Wiley
 (Paper 22) H.S.M. Coxeter, Regular and Semi Regular Polytopes I, [Math. Zeit. 46 (1940) 380-407, MR 2,10]
 (Paper 23) H.S.M. Coxeter, Regular and Semi-Regular Polytopes II, [Math. Zeit. 188 (1985) 559-591]
 (Paper 24) H.S.M. Coxeter, Regular and Semi-Regular Polytopes III, [Math. Zeit. 200 (1988) 3-45]
 
  
 John H. Conway, Heidi Burgiel, Chaim Goodman-Strass, The Symmetries of Things 2008,  (Chapter 26. pp. 409: Hemicubes: 1n1)
 Norman Johnson Uniform Polytopes, Manuscript (1991)
 N.W. Johnson: The Theory of Uniform Polytopes and Honeycombs, Ph.D. (1966)

External links 
 
 Der 16-Zeller (16-cell) Marco Möller's Regular polytopes in R4 (German)
Description and diagrams of 16-cell projections
 

 016